FVH may refer to:

Franco-Vietnamese Hospital, a Vietnamese healthcare provider
Friends of Vietnam Heritage, a Vietnamese heritage organization